Thonotosassa is a census-designated place (CDP) in Hillsborough County, Florida, United States. The population was 15,238 at the 2020 census, up from 13,014 at the 2010 census.

History

The name "Thonotosassa" comes from the Seminole-Creek words  "flint" and  "some", meaning the place was a source of valuable flint. Following the establishment of Fort Brooke in 1824 in what is now Tampa, a road that ran northwest of Lake Thonotosassa was built between Fort Brooke and Fort King in Ocala. This road became known as the Fort King Road, which today is crossed in several locations by U.S. Route 301. Nevertheless, the presence of a Seminole village largely discouraged whites from moving into the area. After the Second Seminole War ended in 1842, whites began to settle.

In 1893, the Tampa and Thonotosassa Railroad opened a  route between the two growing communities. This line today no longer extends into Thonotosassa, its northern tracks having been removed along with the town depot by the 1980s, but its southern portion remains a busy industrial spur, joining with the CSX main line at Neve Wye.

Among other areas for recreation for the youth is the Morris Bridge Road area and its Nature's Classroom.

Geography
Thonotosassa is located in northeastern Hillsborough County at  (28.056135, -82.292663). It is bordered to the southwest by East Lake-Orient Park, and to the south by Mango and Seffner. The unincorporated community of Antioch is on the eastern edge of the CDP.

The Hillsborough River forms the northern edge of the CDP, Interstate 4 forms the southern edge, and Interstate 75 forms the western edge. I-4 leads east  to Lakeland and west  to downtown Tampa, while I-75 leads north  to Ocala and south  to Bradenton. U.S. Route 301 travels through the northern part of Thonotosassa, leading northeast  to Zephyrhills and south  to Riverview.

Demographics

As of the census of 2000, there were 6,091 people, 2,178 households, and 1,616 families residing in the community. The racial makeup of the community was 90.63% White, 4.94% African American, 0.51% Native American, 0.38% Asian, 0.03% Pacific Islander, 1.79% from other races, and 1.72% from two or more races. Hispanic or Latino of any race were 6.29% of the population.

There were 2,178 households, out of which 34.9% had children under the age of 18 living with them, 55.6% were married couples living together, 12.2% had a female householder with no husband present, and 25.8% were non-families. 20.1% of all households were made up of individuals, and 8.1% had someone living alone who was 65 years of age or older.  The average household size was 2.72 and the average family size was 3.07.

In the community the population was spread out, with 26.7% under the age of 18, 7.6% from 18 to 24, 28.6% from 25 to 44, 23.1% from 45 to 64, and 14.0% who were 65 years of age or older.  The median age was 37 years. For every 100 females, there were 99.6 males.  For every 100 females age 18 and over, there were 95.4 males.

The median income for a household in the community was $43,159, and the median income for a family was $44,829. Males had a median income of $31,914 versus $22,674 for females. The per capita income for the community was $18,191.  About 12.7% of families and 16.0% of the population were below the poverty line, including 23.2% of those under age 18 and 17.4% of those age 65 or over.

Education

Public schools

Elementary schools
Folsom Elementary School
Thonotosassa Elementary School

Charter schools

Dr. Kiran C. Patel High School

Libraries
Thonotosassa Branch Library

References

External links

Census-designated places in Hillsborough County, Florida
Census-designated places in Florida